The Fichtner  Covered Bridge', also known as Palo Alto Bridge, is a historic wooden covered bridge located at Londonderry Township in Bedford County, Pennsylvania. It crosses Gladdens Run. It is one of 15 historic covered bridges in Bedford County.

It was listed on the National Register of Historic Places in 1980.

References 

Covered bridges on the National Register of Historic Places in Pennsylvania
Covered bridges in Bedford County, Pennsylvania
Bridges completed in 1880
Wooden bridges in Pennsylvania
Bridges in Bedford County, Pennsylvania
National Register of Historic Places in Bedford County, Pennsylvania
Road bridges on the National Register of Historic Places in Pennsylvania
King post truss bridges in the United States